This is a comprehensive listing of official releases by The Lemonheads.

The Lemonheads are an alternative rock band formed in 1986 in Boston, Massachusetts featuring guitarist, vocalist and songwriter Evan Dando, who is the only original member left in the current Lemonheads line-up. Current members in addition to Dando are Karl Alvarez, Vess Ruhtenberg, Bill Stevenson and Devon Ashley; previous members include original band co-founder Ben Deily, and Juliana Hatfield. The first Lemonheads album, Hate Your Friends, was released in 1987 on punk/underground label Taang! Records. After releasing two more albums in the next two years, both of which performed well on North American college radio, the band parted ways with Taang! and signed to Atlantic in 1990. Over this period, the band's fame rose, as did their charting positions. After the 1996 release of the Car Button Cloth album, The Lemonheads went on an extended hiatus before reuniting in the early 2000s. In their recording career, the band has released eight studio albums, two compilation albums, three extended plays and 15 singles.

NOTE: This list is not intended to include material that members have recorded or performed outside the Lemonheads.

Studio albums

EPs

Demos

Compilations

Singles

Music videos

Tribute albums 

 Drug Buddies: A Tribute To The Lemonheads (Double D Records) - 2009

Bootlegs 

 Petrol Side Salad (live at the Astoria in London) - 15 October 1992
 The secret life of Evan Dando (live at McCabes Guitar Shop, Los Angeles, CA, USA) - May 1993

References

Discographies of American artists
Lemonheads, The